Agden is a small civil parish in the unitary authority of Cheshire West and Chester and the ceremonial county of Cheshire, England.  It is the site of Agden Hall. The parish has a parish meeting rather than a parish council. At the 2001 census it had a population of 42.

See also

Listed buildings in Agden, Cheshire West and Chester

References

External links

Villages in Cheshire
Civil parishes in Cheshire